Kappa Mu Epsilon is a mathematics honor society founded by Emily Kathryn Wyant in 1931 at Northeastern Oklahoma State Teachers College to focus on the needs of undergraduate mathematics students. There are now over 80,000 members in about 150 chapters at various American universities and colleges in 35 states, primarily at mid-sized public universities or smaller private institutions.  The five goals of Kappa Mu Epsilon are to further interest in mathematics, emphasize the role of mathematics in the development of civilization, develop an appreciation of the power and the beauty of mathematics, recognize the outstanding mathematical achievement of its members, and familiarize members with the advancements being made in mathematics.

The society sponsors a biennial national conference as well as regional conventions on alternate years which allow both for the sharing of ideas and the opportunity for students to present papers, preparing them for the graduate research experience.

KME also produces a yearly journal called The Pentagon which publishes student articles on a variety of mathematical topics.

The current president of KME is Dr. Brian Hollenbeck, a mathematics professor at Emporia State University in Emporia, Kansas. The president-elect is Dr. Don Tosh.

The organization had become an official member of the Association of College Honor Societies back in 1968.

See also 
 Mu Alpha Theta,  (mathematics, high school)
 Mu Sigma Rho,  (statistics)
 Pi Mu Epsilon,  (mathematics)
 Association of College Honor Societies

References

External links
 KME Website (including history link)
 Eastern Connecticut State University | Kappa Mu Epsilon
  ACHS Kappa Mu Epsilon entry
  Kappa Mu Epsilon chapter list at ACHS

Association of College Honor Societies
Honor societies
Mathematical societies
1931 establishments in Oklahoma
Student organizations established in 1931